Bijnapalli or Bijinapally is a mandal in Nagarkurnool district, Telangana.

Geography
It has an average elevation of 481 metres (1581 ft).

Institutions
 Zilla Parishad High School for Boys
 Zilla Parishad High School for Girls
 Pragathi Vidyalayam
 Sri Saraswati Vidyaniketan
 All saints model school

Villages
The villages in Bijinapalle mandal include:

 Allipur
 Bijinepally 	
 Gangaram	
 Gouraram 	
 Gudlanarva 	
 Kanapur 	
 Karkonda 	
 Lattupally
 Lingasanipally 	
 Mahadevpet 	
 Manganoor 	
 Mommaipally 
 Palem 	
 Polepally 	
 Salkarpet 	
 Shainpally
 Vasanthapur 
 Vaddemaan (Nandi Vaddemaan)	
 Vattem 	
 Velgonda

References

Mandals in Mahbubnagar district